The Makushin Volcano (also known as Mount Makushin) is an ice-covered stratovolcano located on Unalaska Island in the Aleutian Islands of the U.S. state of Alaska. Makushin is one of the most active among the 52 historically active volcanoes of Alaska. It has erupted at least two dozen times over the past several thousand years, with the last eruption occurring in 1995.

Etymology

In 1792, Sarichev called the volcano "Ognedyshushchaya Gora" meaning "fire-breathing mountain", i.e. volcano in Russian. In 1825, it was known as Makuschkin Volcano, possibly from the Russian word makushka, meaning "the top (of the head)". Its native name was Aigagin, a derivative of the word Aigak in the native tongue of the Aleuts.
Makushin was also the native village here on the northern shore of the Makushin Bay where the foreman or bidarshik of  the Russian American Company lived. There were six huts (yourts) where 35 natives lived.

Alaska Volcano Observatory has identified "Ajagin Wesselow", "Makushin Volcano", "Ajagisch", "Makouchine", "Ognedieshutshai Gora", "Ayagsh", "Aiyagin", "Cheerful Mtn.", "Ayyagyh", "Ayagish", "Makuschkin Volcano", "Ognedyshushchaya Gora" and "Makishinskaia sopka" as alternate names for the Makushin Volcano. Specifically identified here are the four features namely, Red Cinder Dome, Pakushin cone, the Sugarloaf and the Point Kadin vents.

History

Origins
The history of the volcano has been identified with the early Pliocene age. However, the caldera of the volcano is dated to a comparatively recent history of 8000 years.  The “Sugarloaf cone on the ENE flank, and a cluster of about a dozen explosion pits and cinder cones at Point Kadin on the WNW flank” is attributed to the Holocene age.

According to the history recorded by the Alaska Volcano Observatory: “The first episode began in Pliocene or early Pleistocene time (the oldest known age of lavas is 0.93 Ma [Nye, 1990]) and produced extensive flows and subordinate pyroclastic deposits of basaltic and andesitic composition, which enlarged the island by several kilometers along the northwest coast. Radial dips of flows suggest that Makushin Volcano itself was the principal vent area. The older flows are extensively glaciated, which implies a minimum age of late Pleistocene. The summit of Makushin subsequently collapsed, forming a summit caldera. Andesitic pyroclastic-flow and debris flow deposits occur in glaciated valleys on the north and south sides of the volcano indicating a Holocene age for the caldera-forming eruption."

Activity

Historically, Makushin is one of the most active volcanoes in the Aleutian Islands, erupting at least two dozen times over the past several thousands years, the last in 1995. Seventeen explosions or eruptions of the  Makushin Volcano have been recorded since 1786,  though the magnitude has been termed as “small-to-moderate”. These were recorded in the years 1768–69, 1790?, 1792?, 1802, 1818?, 1826–38?, 1844?, 1865, 1867?, 1883, 1907, 1912?, 1926, 1938, 1951, 1952?, 1980, 1987 and 1995. Makushin's pinnacle last erupted on January 30, 1995,  which generated ash extending  to an altitude of  2.5 km.

Although the volcano has not erupted since 1995, studies conducted between July 1996 and August 2000 recorded some 176 minor earthquakes registering between 0.1 and 3.2 on the Richter Scale, occurring on average 2 to 3 times a month.

The volcano was climbed by English born American geographer  George Davidson in 1867 who conducted some important geographical and geological research into the volcano area and the Makushin valley.

Geography

Mount Makushin  is located on the northern Unalaska Island, which is situated to the west of the town of Dutch Harbor. Fumaroles and hot springs in area form a roughly linear trend. About  to the south of this volcano is the “composite Pakushin cone” that has multiple craters, which is 4000 years old eruption; pyroclastic flows and surges have been reported here. The southeast flank of the volcano has rock exposures, at  elevation.

The pyroclastic flows deposited by the eruptions forming the Caldera have engulfed valleys in the eastern, northeastern, northern, and western valleys of the valley with depths up to 100 m. A subsidiary cone formed is the Pakushin Cone),  on the south. In the east and southeast part of  the volcano hot springs and fumaroles have been created, at the summit and in valleys. A valley of the same name stretches to the northeast of the volcano from Broad Bay in Captain's Bay and was identified as a glacial valley after a survey in 1873.

The terrain surrounding the volcano is very rugged but most of the surface surrounding the volcano is vegetated. However, it is generally less pronounced in the area of pyroclastic flows and deposits.  Areas of short and tall grass grow in the volcano area, ranging from less than 20 cm high to over 1 meter.

John Muir, the Scottish-born American naturalist (1838–1914), in his book "The Cruise of the Corwin (1881)", has vividly described this volcano: 

It is situated on a well protected bay. This was at the cross roads of shipping and trade during Russian occupation (1741–1867). Dutch Harbor another important harbor town across the Unalaska town  was a major naval base during the World War II. Fishing and crabbing industries have been the mainstay of the economy of Unalaska island.

Research studies
The high-temperature geothermal resources study of volcanoes in Alaska has covered the geothermal areas in  the summit caldera peak and also on the southeastern and eastern flanks of the Makushin. It is recorded as a subduction-related volcanic arc in the middle of the great Aleutian chain.

Energy resources from the geothermal reservoir beneath the volcano have been assessed in a study carried out by the Alaska Power Authority to meet the power demands of the town of Unalaska and the Dutch Harbor. The study has established that such an energy generation from the geothermal resources would be cheaper than the diesel power system existing on the island.

See also

List of mountain peaks of North America
List of mountain peaks of the United States
List of mountain peaks of Alaska
List of Ultras of the United States
List of volcanoes in the United States

References

Sources
 Global Volcanism Program
 Volcanoes of the Alaska Peninsula and Aleutian Islands-Selected Photographs
 Alaska Volcano Observatory
Volcanoes USGS

External links

Landforms of Aleutians West Census Area, Alaska
Stratovolcanoes of the United States
Active volcanoes
Mountains of Alaska
Volcanoes of Alaska
VEI-5 volcanoes
Aleutian Range
Unalaska Island
Calderas of Alaska
Mountains of Unorganized Borough, Alaska
Volcanoes of Unorganized Borough, Alaska
Holocene calderas
Pleistocene stratovolcanoes
Holocene stratovolcanoes